The Somali giant blind-snake (Afrotyphlops brevis), also known as the angle-snouted blind snake, is a species of snake in the Typhlopidae family. It is found in South Sudan, southern Ethiopia, Somalia, Uganda, and northern Kenya.

References 

Afrotyphlops
Snakes of Africa
Reptiles of Ethiopia
Reptiles of Kenya
Reptiles of Somalia
Reptiles of South Sudan
Reptiles of Uganda
Reptiles described in 1929
Taxa named by Giuseppe Scortecci